Apagomerina erythronota is a species of beetle in the family Cerambycidae. It was described by Lane in 1970. It is known from Brazil.

References

erythronota
Beetles described in 1970